Josef Šíma (18 March 1891 – 24 July 1971) was a Czechoslovak modernist painter.

Biography
After graduating from Academy of Arts in Prague where he was the student of Jan Preisler he was involved in the Devětsil movement and in Umělecká beseda in Prague before travelling to Paris in 1921. He took French citizenship in 1926. He was artistic director for the journal Le Grand Jeu in 1929 and friend of French poets René Daumal, Roger Gilbert-Lecomte and Roger Vailland.

Style
His sources of inspiration spanned from sensual experience, through civil themes, geometric abstraction, imaginative seeking of archetypes of nature, things and human existence pictured as crystals, cosmic egg and female torsos to fascination by landscapes and mythology, until he finally united all these elements and made a synthesis of them in cosmic visions and symbols of human destiny.

He exhibited at documenta 2 in 1959. He also illustrated many books, made book covers, scenic paintings and designed stained glass windows (e. g. in The Church of St Jacques in Reims).

External links

the-artists.org entry
Art Encyclopedia entry

1891 births
1971 deaths
People from Jaroměř
Czech surrealist artists
20th-century Czech painters
Czech male painters
20th-century Czech male artists